Lucian Vasilache (born 4 December 1954) is a retired Romanian handball pivot who won a bronze medal at the 1980 Olympics. He played five matches and scored eight goals.

References

1954 births
Living people
People from Bacău County
Romanian male handball players
Handball players at the 1980 Summer Olympics
Olympic handball players of Romania
Olympic bronze medalists for Romania
Olympic medalists in handball
Medalists at the 1980 Summer Olympics